Ponnagaram is a neighbourhood in Madurai district of Tamil Nadu state in the peninsular India. Former CPM MLA late N. Nanmaran was born in Ponnagaram. Vikaasa group of schools has a branch viz., Vikaasa School at Ponnagaram.

Ponnagaram area falls under the Madurai Central Assembly constituency. The winner of the election held in the year 2021 as the member of its assembly constituency is P. T. R. Palanivel Thiagarajan. Also, this area belongs to Madurai Lok Sabha constituency. The winner of the election held in the year 2019, as the member of its Lok Sabha constituency is S. Venkatesan.

References 

Neighbourhoods and suburbs of Madurai